The Russian Gyroplanes Gyros-2 Smartflier is a Russian autogyro designed and produced by Russian Gyroplanes of Zhukovsky, Moscow Oblast. The aircraft is supplied complete and ready-to-fly.

Design and development
The Gyros-2 was designed for a variety of roles, including aerial application, courier, forestry patrol, search and rescue, geological survey, air taxi and flight training. It features a single main rotor, a two seats in side-by-side configuration enclosed cockpit accessed by doors, tricycle landing gear, plus a tailwheel and a  Mistral 200 engine in tractor configuration.

The aircraft also fits an optional Racket 120 single-cylinder, two-stroke auxiliary engine for running the agricultural equipment, when it is installed.

The aircraft has a two-bladed rotor and a three or six-bladed tractor propeller.

Specifications (Gyros-2)

See also
List of rotorcraft
Russian Gyroplanes Gyros-1 Farmer

References

External links

Official website

Gyros-2
2000s Russian civil utility aircraft
Single-engined tractor autogyros
Twin-tail aircraft